Khadim Hussain Khan (1907 – 11 January 1993) was an Indian classical music singer born in Atrauli, United Provinces of Agra and Oudh, India.

Early life
Khadim Hussain Khan was born in Atrauli, United Provinces of Agra and Oudh in 1907.
Initiated into music by his father Altaf Hussain Khan, he went on to learn from his grand uncle Ustad Kallan Khan. They were both court musicians of the Jaipur Kingdom in present-day Rajasthan, India.

Musical career
Khadim Hussain Khan settled in Bombay in the late twenties and was associated with musical life in Mumbai for several decades. He was a capable performer, with the ability to show forth the unique features of the Agra gharana style of singing and all its eight angs. However, it was as a music teacher that he will be remembered by. Although he had been a broadcaster since the inception of All India Radio (AIR), he made teaching music his life's mission. Among his students are Ustad Latafat Hussain Khan, Saguna Kalyanpur, Lalith J. Rao and Babanrao Haldankar.

He also was a composer of bandishes and taranas under the nom-de-plume of "Sajan Piya". A number of his compositions are still used by Agra gharana performers today. He composed a number of bhajans as well.

Awards and recognitions 
Maharashtra State Award (1978)
Sangeet Natak Akademi Award (1978)
Padma Bhushan Award by the Government of India (1982)
Tansen Samman Award by the Government of Madhya Pradesh (1986)

Death
Khadim Hussain Khan died on 11 January 1993 at age 86.

References

1907 births
1993 deaths
Hindustani singers
People from Aligarh district
Recipients of the Padma Bhushan in arts
Recipients of the Sangeet Natak Akademi Award
20th-century Indian male classical singers
Singers from Uttar Pradesh
20th-century Khyal singers
Agra gharana